The Pine Island State Forest is a Minnesota state forest located primarily in Koochiching County, although there are portions that extend into Beltrami, Lake of the Woods, and Itasca counties. The forest borders the Koochiching State Forest to the east, the Red Lake State Forest to the west, and Big Fork State Forest and Chippewa National Forest to the south.

The location of Lake Agassiz in the area led to the flat topography of the forest, which is dotted with wetlands and bogs, and a sandy loam throughout.  The vast expanses of old-growth northern whitecedar and pine were extensively logged in the early 20th century. But nowadays, the landscape is dominated by black spruce, tamarack, and northern whitecedar in the lowlands; aspen, pine, and balsam fir, which is predominate in upland sites.

Recreation
Popular outdoor recreational activities in the forest are largely centered on the Big Fork River, and include swimming, fishing, canoeing, kayaking, and boating. Trails are designated for a variety of uses, including  for hiking. In the wintertime, trails are designated for snowmobiling, with  designated for cross-country skiing. Snowshoeing and hunting are available throughout the forest.

See also
List of Minnesota state forests

References

External links
Pine Island State Forest - Minnesota Department of Natural Resources (DNR)

Minnesota state forests
Protected areas of Koochiching County, Minnesota
Protected areas of Beltrami County, Minnesota
Protected areas of Itasca County, Minnesota
Protected areas of Lake of the Woods County, Minnesota
Protected areas established in 1933
1933 establishments in Minnesota